The carbonate chlorides are double salts containing both carbonate and chloride anions. Quite a few minerals are known. Several artificial compounds have been made. Some complexes have both carbonate and chloride ligands. They are part of the family of halocarbonates. In turn these halocarbonates are a part of mixed anion materials.

The carbonate chlorides do not have a bond from chlorine to carbon, however "chlorocarbonate" has also been used to refer to the chloroformates which contain the group ClC(O)O-.

Formation

Natural 
Scapolite is produced in nature by metasomatism, where hot high pressure water solutions of carbon dioxide and sodium chloride modify plagioclase.

Chloroartinite is found in Sorel cements exposed to air.

Minerals
In 2016 27 chloride containing carbonate minerals were known.

Artificial

Complexes
The "lanthaballs" are lanthanoid atom clusters held together by carbonate and other ligands. They can form chlorides. Examples are [La13(ccnm)6(CO3)14(H2O)6(phen)18] Cl3(CO3)·25H2O where ccnm is carbamoylcyanonitrosomethanide and phen is 1,10-phenanthroline. Praseodymium (Pr) or cerium (Ce) can substitute for lanthanum (La). Other lanthanide cluster compounds include :(H3O)6[Dy76O10(OH)138(OAc)20(L)44(H2O)34]•2CO3•4
Cl2•L•2OAc (nicknamed Dy76) and (H3O)6[Dy48O6(OH)84(OAc)4(L)15(hmp)18(H2O)20]•CO3•14Cl•2H2O (termed Dy48-T) with OAc=acetate, and L=3-furancarboxylate and Hhmp=2,2-bis(hydroxymethyl)propionic acid.

Platinum can form complexes with carbonate and chloride ligands, in addition to an amino acid. Examples include the platinum compound [Pt(gluH)Cl(CO3)]2.2H2O gluH=glutamic acid, and Na[Pt(gln)Cl2(CO3)].H2O gln=glutamine. Rhodium complexes include Rh2(bipy)2(CO3)2Cl (bipy=bipyridine)

References

Carbonates
Chlorides
Mixed anion compounds
Double salts